Casinos is a municipality in the comarca of Camp de Túria in the Valencian Community, Spain.

Dragées and Spanish Nougat 
Casinos is a village with a former tradition of production of Sugared almonds, dragées (Peladillas) and Spanish Nougat, Turrón, Torró de Casinos.

See too 
Sugared almonds
Valencian cuisine
Valencian Community
Turrón
Dragées

References

External links 
 Information about the November's Casinos Dragées and Nougats Fair (In Spanish)
 Information about the village (In Spanish and Valencian)

Municipalities in Camp de Túria
Populated places in Camp de Túria